The 2017 6 Hours of Silverstone was an endurance sports car racing event held at the Silverstone Circuit in Northamptonshire, England on 14–16 April 2017. Silverstone served as the opening round of the 2017 FIA World Endurance Championship, and was the sixth running of the event as part of the championship. The event was won by the #8 Toyota Gazoo Racing TS050 Hybrid

Qualifying

Qualifying results
Pole position winners in each class are marked in bold.

Race

Race result
The minimum number of laps for classification (70% of the overall winning car's race distance) was 138 laps. Class winners in bold.

Standings after the race

2017 LMP FIA World Endurance Drivers Championship standings

2017 LMP1 FIA World Endurance Manufacturers Championship standings

 Note: Only the top five positions are included for the Drivers' Championship standings.

2017 GT FIA World Endurance Drivers Championship standings

2017 GT FIA World Endurance Manufacturers Championship standings

 Note: Only the top five positions are included for the Drivers' Championship standings.

Notes

References

External links
 

Silverstone
Silverstone
6 Hours of Silverstone
6 Hours of Silverstone
RAC Tourist Trophy